The 2022 Interwetten European Darts Grand Prix was the seventh of thirteen PDC European Tour events on the 2022 PDC Pro Tour. The tournament took place at the Hanns-Martin-Schleyer-Halle, Stuttgart, Germany, from 20–22 May 2022. It featured a field of 48 players and £140,000 in prize money, with £25,000 going to the winner.

José de Sousa was the defending champion after defeating Michael van Gerwen 8–4 in the 2020 final, but lost in the second round 6–5 to Andrew Gilding.

Luke Humphries won his third European Tour title of 2022, defeating Rob Cross 8–7 in a repeat of the final from the previous European Tour event a week earlier.

The original venue for this tournament was the Glaspalast in Sindelfingen, but it was being used as accommodation for Ukrainian refugees fleeing from the Russian invasion of Ukraine.

Prize money
The prize money is unchanged from the European Tours of the last 3 years:

 Seeded players who lose in the second round and host nation qualifiers (who qualify automatically as a result of their ranking) who lose in their first match of the event shall not be credited with prize money on any Order of Merit. A player who qualifies as a qualifier, but later becomes a seed due to the withdrawal of one or more other players shall be credited with their prize money on all Orders of Merit regardless of how far they progress in the event.

Qualification and format
The top 16 entrants from the PDC ProTour Order of Merit on 29 March automatically qualified for the event and were seeded in the second round.

The remaining 32 places went to players from six qualifying events – 24 from the Tour Card Holder Qualifier (held on 8 April), two from the Associate Member Qualifier (held on 22 April), the two highest ProTour ranking German players, two from the Host Nation Qualifier (held on 22 April), one from the Nordic & Baltic Associate Member Qualifier (held on 19 February), and one from the East European Associate Member Qualifier (held on 23 April).

Top seed Gerwyn Price withdrew from the event, so Martin Schindler became a seed and Eddie Lovely received a bye into the second round.

The following players took part in the tournament:

Top 16
  (second round)
  (second round)
  (semi-finals)
  (second round)
  (runner-up)
  (second round)
  (second round)
  (semi-finals)
  (third round)
  (champion)
  (second round)
  (third round)
  (third round)
  (third round)
  (quarter-finals)
  (quarter-finals)

Tour Card Qualifier
  (second round)
  (second round)
  (first round)
  (first round)
  (second round)
  (first round)
  (third round)
  (second round)
  (first round)
  (first round)
  (quarter-finals)
  (third round)
  (first round)
  (third round)
  (second round)
  (quarter-finals)
  (second round)
  (third round)
  (first round)
  (first round)
  (second round)
  (first round)
  (second round)
  (first round)

Associate Member Qualifier
  (second round)
  (first round)

Highest Ranked Germans
  (first round)

Host Nation Qualifier
  (first round)
  (first round)

Nordic & Baltic Qualifier
  (second round)

East European Qualifier
  (first round)

Draw

Notes

References

2022 PDC Pro Tour
2022 PDC European Tour
2022 in German sport
May 2022 sports events in Germany